Makrisia is a village in the municipal unit of Skillounta, Elis, Greece. In 2011 its population was 1,720. It is situated near the left bank of the river Alfeios, 2 km northwest of Krestena, 3 km northeast of Kallikomo, 4 km southwest of Olympia and 16 km southeast of Pyrgos.

Population

See also

List of settlements in Elis

References

External links
Makrisia at the GTP Travel Pages

Skillounta
Populated places in Elis